Lacrimispora amygdalinum  is a Gram-positive, anaerobic and rod-shaped bacterium from the genus Lacrimispora which has been isolated from sludge from a wastewater treatment plant in the Netherlands.

References

 

Bacteria described in 2003
Lachnospiraceae